The Egyptian Alliance Party  is a political party in Egypt. It is headed by Muhammed Al Gilany who is a member of the National Association for Change.

References

2011 establishments in Egypt
Political parties established in 2011
Political parties in Egypt